Ben Hill Park is a  community park in the Ben Hill neighborhood of southwest Atlanta, Georgia. 

It includes one recreation center, one covered basketball court, two tennis courts, and one multipurpose baseball/football field. The recreation center was later renamed to William Walker Recreation Center, in honor of the longtime director, William Walker.

References 

Parks in Atlanta